Amaxia chaon is a moth of the family Erebidae. It was described by Herbert Druce in 1883. It is found in Ecuador, Suriname and French Guiana.

References

Moths described in 1883
Amaxia
Moths of South America